Gustavo Hernán Pinto (born 29 May 1979 in Ciudadela, Buenos Aires) is a former Argentine footballer and current manager.

Career
Born in Buenos Aires Province, Pinto began playing professional football as a midfielder with Club Atlético Boca Juniors. During his time at Boca Juniors, the club won the 2001 Copa Libertadores.

He has played for a number of clubs in Argentina and has also played in Russia with Torpedo-Metallurg and FC Moscow and in Ecuador with Emelec.

Coaching career
Pinto worked as a youth coach at Boca Juniors for five years, before leaving his position in the beginning of 2021, to join Mexican club Cancún, where he was appointed manager. He left the position in June 2021.

References

External links
 Argentine Primera Statistics  
 Profile & Statistics at Guardian's Stats centre

1979 births
Living people
Argentine footballers
Argentine expatriate footballers
Sportspeople from Buenos Aires Province
Association football midfielders
Argentine Primera División players
Argentine expatriate sportspeople in Ecuador
Argentine expatriate sportspeople in Russia
Argentine expatriate sportspeople in Mexico
Expatriate footballers in Ecuador
Expatriate footballers in Russia
Boca Juniors footballers
FC Moscow players
Russian Premier League players
C.S. Emelec footballers
Godoy Cruz Antonio Tomba footballers
Olimpo footballers
Argentine football managers